Nevada wine refers to wine made from grapes grown in the U.S. state of Nevada, where wine has been produced since 1990. There are currently no designated American Viticultural Areas in Nevada.

Nevada has five commercial wineries: Basin and Range Cellars in Reno(opening in June 2018), Nevada Sunset Winery also in Reno,Churchill Vineyards in Fallon,  Pahrump Valley Winery in Pahrump and Sanders Family Winery (also located in Pahrump).

Locally high boron content of the soil, soil salinity, and hard water provide a few challenges to growing grapes, especially Vitis vinefera. Some environmental elements common to Nevada however are favorable for viticulture; these include the ample sunshine, low humidity (which decreases the risk for rot and mildew and thus the need for fungicides)  University of Nevada, Reno professor Dr. Grant Cramer is currently studying the best varietals and techniques at UNR's Valley Road Vineyard. Wine grapes have been grown with success in both the northern and southern part of the state since 1991, and all five wineries have produced wines made from grapes grown in Nevada.

Until recently, state law restricted commercial wineries so that they were illegal in counties with more than 100,000 people (Washoe and Clark Counties). This was due to lobbying by the liquor distributors in the State for fight to control the liquor supply. With the passage of Assembly Bill 4 (AB4)in November 2015  this law was changed. Since then three wineries have filed for licenses and began winemaking in Reno (Basin and Range Cellars, Nevada Sunset Winery and Great Basin Winery. The laws for winemaking in Nevada are still considered to be restrictive when compared to neighboring states that have successful wine industries.  
Additionally, instructional wine-making facilities (such as the Valley Road Vineyard) may operate in any county but must meet special license requirements and are restricted to selling or distributing no more than 60 gallons of wine in any 12-month period.

See also
Alcohol laws of Nevada
American wine

References

External links
Appellation America: Nevada State Profile
Appellation America: Pahrump Valley Winery defining Southern Nevada diversity
 Dr. Grant Cramer's home page
Home Vineyards in Northern Nevada
Nevada Wine Tasting blog
Now and Zin, Wine Country: Nevada - Pahrump Valley

Wine regions of the United States by state
Tourism in Nevada
Agriculture in Nevada